Claude Piel (15 January 1921 – 19 August 1982) was a notable French aircraft designer.

Biography
Piel was born in Paris, the son of an aeronautical carpenter.  One of the best known French designers of light aircraft, over the years, Piel designed several single and two seat aeroplanes, the Emeraude and Diamant being the best known.  His first amateur design was adapted from the Mignet Pou du Ciel ("Flying Flea"). Designated CP10, this aircraft, begun in 1943, was only ever a prototype. It crashed in 1949 after only 5h30m flight time.  Piel himself was piloting and was lucky to escape from the accident.

Piel worked for a variety of French aeronautical companies as a designer. In 1948, he went to work with the Boisavia company where his professional career in aircraft design began. In 1952, he left Boisavia and joined Robert Denize where he designed the CP20, which looked like a miniature Spitfire - its wing shape especially.  The CP20 was to be the basis of his subsequent designs, the highly successful CP30 Emeraude. Copavia began to manufacture the Emeraude commercially.

Piel then went to work for SCANOR (Société des Constructions Aéronautiques du Nord), who also produced Emeraudes.  He also sold copies of his plans to amateurs who built their own aeroplanes.

The Scintex company was established in 1956 by Jean-Michel Vernhes and set up a production line to make Emeraudes, by now in great demand from French flying clubs and private owners. Initially, Scintex made the standard CP.301A model. In 1959, Piel moved to Scintex and the following year they developed the CP301C variant, which had a sliding canopy instead of the upward-opening doors of the earlier model. Scintex also built the Super Emeraude, with an airframe strengthened for aerobatics and a cleaner external design. Most Scintex Emeraudes and Super Emeraudes were built in the Menavia factory at Clermont-Ferrand.

Piel later moved to CAARP (Cooperatives des Ateliers Aéronautiques de la Region Parisienne).  In 1965, CAARP was set up by Auguste Mudry, principally as a design bureau using the skills of Piel, Nenad Hrissatovic and Louis de Goncourt. The company originally built CP1310-C3 Super Emeraudes, and went on to make the CP100 and CAP10 derivatives.

Other designs from Piel included the CP.60 Diamant, CP.80 racer and CP.150 Onyx microlight.

Complete list of designs

Notes

References
 R W Simpson, Airlife's General Aviation Airlife Publishing, Shrewsbury 1991
 Patrick Ehrhardt & Jean Molveau, Claude Piel Histoire de Pierres Précieuses Edition Le Trait d'Union.
 Patrick Ehrhardt & Jean Molveau, "A History of Precious Stones: Claude Piel - A craftsman and a constructor" in Air-Britain Digest, May–June 1985 (edited version in English of above)
 Xavier Massé, Avions Piel : Du CP 10 de 1944 au CP 150 de 1983 Nouvelles Éditions Latines, Paris, 2004
 Nick Bloom, "Piel Emeraude" in  Pilot, February 2005, pp 60–64

External links

 www.avions-piel.com discussion forum and gallery  
 Photo of Piel and CP30, believed on day of first flight
 emeraude

1921 births
1982 deaths
French aerospace engineers